Battle of the Year is a 2013 American 3D dance film directed by Benson Lee. The film was released on September 20, 2013 through Screen Gems and stars Josh Holloway, Chris Brown, Laz Alonso, Caity Lotz, and Josh Peck.

Battle of the Year is based upon Lee's award-winning 2007 documentary Planet B-Boy, about the b-boying competition of the same name. The feature film includes cinematography by Vasco Nunes, Lee's director of photography on the original documentary.

Plot
Dante Graham enlists Jason Blake to coach the United States' b-boy team to compete in the Battle of the Year, as the US has not won in 15 years. Blake puts together a team of the best b-boys across America à la Dream Team. After overcoming their differences and learning to work as a team, the Dream Team makes it to the semi-finals, beats the reigning champion French team and finds themselves against the favorites, the Koreans. Ultimately, they lose by one point. Blake resolves to resume training as soon as possible to win next year.

Cast
 Josh Holloway as Jason Blake 
 Chris Brown as "Rooster"
 Josh Peck as Franklyn
 Laz Alonso as Dante Graham
 Caity Lotz as Stacy
 Jon "Do Knock" Cruz as "Do Knock"
 Ivan "Flipz" Velez as "Flipz"
 Richard Carmelo Soto as "Abbstarr"
 Terrence J as himself
 Sway Calloway as himself 
 Anis Cheurfa as Anis
 Weronika Rosati as Jolene
 Alex Martin as "Punk"
 Dominic Sandoval as "Grifter"
 Steve Terada as "Sight"
 Victor Kim as "Aces"
 Jesse "Casper" Brown as "Rebel"
 David "Kid David" Shreibman as "Kid"
 Luis "Luigi" Rosado as "Bambino"
Sawandi Wilson as "Sniper"

Development
Film company Screen Gems first began planning for a feature film adaptation of Lee's documentary Planet B-Boy in 2009 after discovering that while interest in breakdancing had declined in the United States, it still enjoyed popularity in other countries. Chris Brown and Josh Holloway were announced as being attached to the project in October 2011. Filming began in late 2011 in Los Angeles, with more filming taking place in Montpellier, France.

Marketing
The first trailer for Battle of the Year was released in July 2013, with Adam Chitwood, Associate Editor of Collider stating that "if B-boy competitions are your thing I assume you'll have some interest in Battle of the Year." Screen Crush commented that the 3D aspect "could be a lot of fun with a film like this" but questioned whether the film would stand out against "an A-list title".

Reception

Critical response
The film was universally panned by film critics.

Box office

The film was a significant box office bomb grossing roughly $16 million and failed to recoup its budget of $20 million.

Awards and nominations

References

External links
 
 
 

2013 films
2013 3D films
Screen Gems films
American musical drama films
2010s musical drama films
Films shot in France
Films shot in Los Angeles
Films scored by Christopher Lennertz
Films produced by Beau Flynn
Films produced by Will Packer
2013 drama films
Breakdancing films
2010s English-language films
2010s American films